James M. Skibo (born January 7, 1960) is an American archaeologist and currently is the Wisconsin State Archaeologist.  His archaeological research focuses on the production and use of ceramics as well as the theory of archaeology and ethnoarchaeology. He is mainly concerned with the Great Lakes, the Southwest United States, and the Philippines.

Education and career 

Skibo studied anthropology at Northern Michigan University from 1978 to 1982 and received a Bachelor of Science, Magna cum laude. He then attended the University of Arizona from 1982 to 1990 studying with the late William A. Longacre and Michael Brian Schiffer. There he received a Master of Arts in 1984 and a Ph.D. in anthropology in 1990. Since 1992 he has been at Illinois State University, where he taught as an assistant professor from 1992 to 1995, as an associate professor from 1996 to 2001, and since 2001 as a full professor. In 2012 he was appointed Distinguished Professor. Since 2014 Skibo has served as the Chair of the Department of Sociology and Anthropology.

Skibo is the publisher of the book series Foundations of Archaeological Inquiry and was the co-editor of the Journal of Archaeological Method and Theory from 2000 to 2018. He is a member of the Society for American Archaeology, the Wisconsin Archaeological Society, the Midwestern Archaeological Conference, the Michigan Archaeological Society, and the Illinois Archaeological Survey.

Skibo is married and has two children.

Research  

In the 1980s he took part in various excavations and surveys in Arizona, often under the direction of Paul R. Fish. From February to June 1988, he conducted an ethnoarchaeological ceramic investigation among the Kalinga in the northwest of the Philippine island of Luzon as part of the Kalinga Ethnoarchaeological Project. From 1999 to 2001, he was, together with William H. Walker, one of two co-directors of the La Frontera Archaeological Research Program, a four-year project to explore Joyce Well, a 14th century Pueblo located in the southwest of New Mexico.
Since 2000, Skibo, along with Eric Drake, has been the Director of the Grand Island Archaeological Field Program, a joint project of Illinois State University and the Hiawatha National Forest, which not only has explored the settlement history of Grand Island but it has also included the training of archaeologists in field research techniques.

Awards 

 1995: Research Initiative Award, Illinois State University
 1996: Outstanding Young Alumni Award from Northern Michigan
 1999–2000 University College Researcher of the Year (1999–2000) of Illinois State University
 2001: National Award for Excellence of the United States Forest Service for contributions to “Windows on the Past.”
 2005: Excellence in Teaching Award of Illinois State University's Student Education Association
 2012: Award for Excellence in Archaeological Analysis, Society for American Archaeology

Publications 

 Pottery Function. A Use-Alteration Perspective. (1992, Plenum Publishing, New York.)
 With William A. Longacre (eds.): Kalinga Ethnoarchaeology: Expanding Archaeological Method and Theory. (1994, Smithsonian Institution Press, Washington, D.C.)
 With Axel E. Nielsen, William H. Walker (eds.): Expanding Archaeology. (1995, University of Utah Press, Salt Lake City)
 With Gary M. Feinman (Eds.): Pottery and People: A Dynamic Interaction. (1999, University of Utah Press, Salt Lake City)
 Ants for Breakfast. Archaeological Adventures Among the Kalinga. (1999, University of Utah Press, Salt Lake City)
 With Eugene B. McCluney, William H. Walker (Eds.): The Joyce Well Site: On the Frontier of the Casas Grandes World. (2002, University of Utah Press)
 Bear Cave Hill: A Memoir. (2006, iUniverse Press, Lincoln, Nebraska)
 With Michael W. Graves, Miriam T. Stark (eds.): Archaeological Anthropology: Perspectives on Method and Theory. (2007, University of Arizona Press, Tucson)
 With Michael B. Schiffer: People and Things: a Behavioral Approach to Material Culture. (2008, Springer, New York)
 Understanding Pottery Function. (2013, Springer Press, New York)
 With William H. Walker (eds.): Explorations in Behavioral Archaeology. (2015, University of Utah Press, Salt Lake City)

References 

Illinois State University faculty
American archaeologists
1960 births
Living people
Northern Michigan University alumni
University of Arizona alumni